The 1925 Massachusetts Aggies football team represented Massachusetts Agricultural College in the 1925 college football season, competing as a member of the New England Conference. The team was coached by Harold Gore and played its home games at Alumni Field in Amherst, Massachusetts. Massachusetts finished the season with an overall record of 6–2, and a conference record of 1–0.

Schedule

References

Massachusetts
UMass Minutemen football seasons
Massachusetts Aggies football